Metallurgy